Picardella is a genus of fungi in the family Laboulbeniaceae. The genus contain 2 species.

References

External links
Picardella at Index Fungorum

Laboulbeniomycetes